Oscar Fredrik Ackeström (born November 29, 1972 in Gothenburg, Sweden) is a retired professional Swedish ice hockey player. In 2009 he was a defenseman for the Hannover Scorpions in the Deutsche Eishockey Liga.

References

External links

1972 births
Fehérvár AV19 players
Frölunda HC players
Linköping HC players
Living people
Swedish ice hockey defencemen
Ice hockey people from Gothenburg